Budy Piaseczne  is a village in the administrative district of Gmina Zawidz, within Sierpc County, Masovian Voivodeship, in east-central Poland.

External links
 Jewish Community in Budy Piaseczne on Virtual Shtetl

References

Budy Piaseczne